TUDN Radio (formerly Univision Deportes Radio) is a U.S. Spanish-language sports radio network operated by Uforia Audio Network, a division of TelevisaUnivision. It launched on March 15, 2017 on ten AM and FM radio stations, most of which previously affiliated with the ill-fated Univision America until its 2015 closure. The network features stations in the states of Arizona, California, Texas, Illinois, Nevada, New York and Florida, covering half of the country's Hispanic population.

While its main focus is on soccer, Univision Deportes Radio competed against ESPN Deportes Radio, owned by ESPN Inc., until 2019 which had 40 stations in 14 states.

On July 20, 2019, the network was renamed TUDN Radio, as part of a wider multi-platform relaunch of the Univision Deportes division as TUDN, in partnership with Televisa. With the September 2019 discontinuation of ESPN Deportes Radio, the network picked up some of its former stations (including Los Angeles' KWKW).

Programming
At the launch of the network, its programming lineup consisted of mainly radio versions of select Univision Deportes Network shows, such as Locura Deportiva (which was originally broadcast on Univision América), Contacto Deportivo, and Fútbol Club, as well as original programming including Buenos Días América, El Tiradero, and Tribuna Interactiva. In 2022, the network plans to begin airing Desde el Diamante (From the Diamond), a weekly show devoted to Major League Baseball news.

The network also broadcasts select Liga MX, Major League Soccer, CONCACAF Champions League and UEFA-sanctioned soccer matches. The network started airing Major League Baseball games during the 2021 playoffs, followed by select regular season games (mainly Spanish simulcasts of Sunday Night Baseball), the Home Run Derby, and the All-Star Game from the following season onward as well as select games of the 2023 World Baseball Classic.

Local sports
Stations air sport games from local professional teams, including:
 Major League Baseball: Los Angeles Angels, Chicago Cubs, Chicago White Sox, New York Yankees, Arizona Diamondbacks, and Texas Rangers;
 Major League Soccer: FC Dallas, Houston Dynamo, LA Galaxy, and Chicago Fire;
 National Basketball Association: Chicago Bulls, Phoenix Suns, and Dallas Mavericks;
 National Football League: Chicago Bears, Los Angeles Rams, and Arizona Cardinals;
 National Hockey League: Chicago Blackhawks and Los Angeles Kings.

On-air talent
 Juan Carlos Ávalos 
 María Fernanda Alonso 
 Leslie Soltero
 Gabriel Sainz 
 Diego Peña 
 Luis Manuel Gómez Luna
 Gustavo Rivadeneira
 Julio César Quintanilla
 Antonio Murillo 
 Miguel Ángel Mendez
 Luis Quiñones
 Reinaldo Navia
 Javier Ledesma
 Ramón Morales
 Pedro Antonio Flores
 Marcelo Salazar
 Katya Mercader
 Ernesto Tadeo Quijas

Affiliates
All affiliates are owned and operated by Univision unless otherwise noted.

United States

Arizona
KBMB 710 kHz (Phoenix)

California
KSOL-HD2 98.9 MHz (San Francisco)
KTMZ 1220 kHz (Pomona)
KWAC 1490 kHz (Bakersfield)
KWKW 1330 kHz (Los Angeles)

Colorado
KMXA 1090 kHz (Aurora)

Florida
WQBA 1140 kHz (Miami) 
WEFL 760 kHz (West Palm Beach)
WIXC 1060 kHz (Melbourne)

Illinois
WKRS 1220 kHz (Waukegan)
WRTO 1200 kHz (Chicago)

Nevada
KLSQ 870 kHz (Las Vegas)

New Jersey
WTTM 1680 kHz (Lindenwold)

New Mexico
KRZY 1450 kHz (Albuquerque)

New York
WADO 1280 kHz (New York City)

Texas
KLQB-HD2 104.3 MHz (Austin)
KFLC 1270 kHz (Dallas) 
KSVE 1650 kHz (El Paso)
KGBT 1530 kHz (Harlingen, Rio Grande Valley) 
KLAT 1010 kHz (Houston) 
KBZO 1460 kHz (Lubbock)
KQBU-FM 93.3 MHz (Port Arthur)

Utah
KTUB 1600 kHz (Salt Lake City)

Former affiliates
KCOR 1350 kHz (San Antonio)
KTNQ 1020 kHz (Los Angeles) [Returned to its previous News/Talk format]
WWBG 1470 kHz (Greensboro, North Carolina)
KLSQ 870 kHz (Las Vegas) [At first, long-term silent; then Classic Hits and back to Spanish Sports]
KROM-HD2 92.9 MHz (San Antonio)
KHOV-FM 105.1 MHz (Phoenix, Arizona)
WJFK 1580 kHz (Washington, D.C.) [Now broadcasting a sports-betting format]
KOOR 1010 kHz (Portland)
XEXX-AM 1420 kHz (Tijuana)

See also
 Univision Communications
 Univision Radio
 Univision Deportes

Notes

References

External links
 

Univision Radio Network stations
American radio networks
Spanish-language radio stations in the United States
Mass media companies established in 2016
Radio stations established in 2017